The 2016–17 season was Ferencvárosi TC's 114th competitive season, 8th consecutive season in the OTP Bank Liga and 117th year in existence as a football club.

First team squad

Transfers

Summer

In:

Out:

Winter

In:

Out:

Statistics

Appearances and goals
Last updated on 31 May 2017.

|-
|colspan="14"|Players out to loan:

|-
|colspan="14"|Players no longer at the club:

|}

Top scorers
Includes all competitive matches. The list is sorted by shirt number when total goals are equal.

Last updated on 31 May 2017

Disciplinary record
Includes all competitive matches. Players with 1 card or more included only.

Last updated on 31 May 2017

Overall
{|class="wikitable"
|-
|Games played || 45 (33 OTP Bank Liga, 2 Champions League and 10 Hungarian Cup)
|-
|Games won || 22 (14 OTP Bank Liga, 0 Champions League and 8 Hungarian Cup)
|-
|Games drawn || 14 (10 OTP Bank Liga, 2 Champions League and 2 Hungarian Cup)
|-
|Games lost || 9 (9 OTP Bank Liga, 0 Champions League and 0 Hungarian Cup)
|-
|Goals scored || 87
|-
|Goals conceded || 52
|-
|Goal difference || +35
|-
|Yellow cards || 114
|-
|Red cards || 5
|-
|rowspan="1"|Worst discipline ||  Michał Nalepa (8 , 2 )
|-
|rowspan="1"|Best result || 9–0 (A) v Koroncó - Hungarian Cup - 26-10-2016
|-
|rowspan="1"|Worst result || 1–4 (A) v Videoton - OTP Bank Liga - 20-05-2017
|-
|rowspan="1"|Most appearances ||  Emir Dilaver (40 appearances)
|-
|rowspan="1"|Top scorer ||  Dániel Böde (16 goals)
|-
|Points || 80/135 (59.26%)
|-

Nemzeti Bajnokság I

Matches

League table

Results summary

Results by round

Hungarian Cup

Europa League

The First and Second Qualifying Round draws took place at UEFA headquarters in Nyon, Switzerland on 20 June 2016.

References

External links
 Official Website
 UEFA
 fixtures and results

2016-17
Hungarian football clubs 2016–17 season